The 83rd parallel north is a circle of latitude that is 83 degrees north of the Earth's equatorial plane, in the Arctic. It passes through the Arctic Ocean and  North America.

The northernmost land on earth, whether the permanent Kaffeklubben Island or the shifting/resubmerging gravel banks of Oodaaq, ATOW1996, or 83-42 are roughly 40 minutes of arc (75 to 79 kilometres) north of this parallel.  

At this latitude the sun is visible for 24 hours, 0 minutes during the summer solstice and astronomical twilight during the winter solstice.

Around the world
Starting at the Prime Meridian and heading eastwards, the parallel 83° north passes through:

{| class="wikitable plainrowheaders"
! scope="col" width="125" | Co-ordinates
! scope="col" | Country, territory or sea
! scope="col" | Notes
|-
| style="background:#b0e0e6;" | 
! scope="row" style="background:#b0e0e6;" | Arctic Ocean
| style="background:#b0e0e6;" |
|-
| 
! scope="row" | 
| Nunavut - Ellesmere Island
|-
| style="background:#b0e0e6;" | 
! scope="row" style="background:#b0e0e6;" | Lincoln Sea
| style="background:#b0e0e6;" |
|-
| 
! scope="row" | 
| Sverdrup Island
|-
| style="background:#b0e0e6;" | 
! scope="row" style="background:#b0e0e6;" | Mascart Sound
| style="background:#b0e0e6;" |
|-
| 
! scope="row" | 
| Nansen Land
|-
| style="background:#b0e0e6;" | 
! scope="row" style="background:#b0e0e6;" | Thomas Thomsen Fjord
| style="background:#b0e0e6;" |
|-
| 
! scope="row" | 
|  Borup Island
|-
| style="background:#b0e0e6;" | 
! scope="row" style="background:#b0e0e6;" | Adolf Jensen Fjord
| style="background:#b0e0e6;" |
|-
| 
! scope="row" | 
| MacMillan Island
|-
| style="background:#b0e0e6;" | 
! scope="row" style="background:#b0e0e6;" | De Long Fjord
| style="background:#b0e0e6;" |
|-
| 
! scope="row" | 
| Amundsen Land
|-
| style="background:#b0e0e6;" | 
! scope="row" style="background:#b0e0e6;" | Frederick E. Hyde Fjord /Citronen Fjord
| style="background:#b0e0e6;" |
|-
| 
! scope="row" | 
| Hans Egede Land
|-
| style="background:#b0e0e6;" | 
! scope="row" style="background:#b0e0e6;" | Arctic Ocean
| style="background:#b0e0e6;" |
|-
|}

See also
 82nd parallel north
 84th parallel north
 Arctic Ocean

n83
Geography of the Arctic